Players in boldface have now been capped at full international level.

Group A

Head coach:  José Luis Pavoni

Head coach:  David Duncan

Head coach:  Zhang Ning

Head coach:  Geovanni Alfaro

Group B

Head coach:  Gustavo Ferrín

Head coach:  Jesús Ramírez

Head coach:  Abdullah Avcı

Head coach:  Ange Postecoglou

¹ David Williams was initially selected as Australia's number 9, however, because he was part of the Australian squad for the 2005 FIFA World Youth Championship, and due to a new regulation introduced for the 2005 U-17 World Championship was ruled ineligible to participate.

Group C

Head coach:  François Bohe

Head coach:  Francesco Rocca

Head coach:  Jo Tong-sop

Head coach:  John Hackworth

Group D

Head coach:  Ruud Kaiser

Head coach:  Tini Ruijs

Head coach:  Nelson Rodrigues

Head coach:  Fred Osam-Duodu

References

Fifa U-17 World Championship Squads, 2005
FIFA U-17 World Cup squads